The Anger is a 27.9 km long river in northeastern France which traverses Vosges in Grand Est. It rises in Dombrot-le-Sec and flows generally northwest to join the Mouzon at Circourt-sur-Mouzon.

References

Rivers of France
Rivers of Grand Est
Rivers of Vosges (department)
Rivers of Haute-Marne